Megachile clypeata is a species of bee in the family Megachilidae. It was described by Smith in 1853.

References

Clypeata
Insects described in 1853